Ithmaar Bank B.S.C. (closed) ("Ithmaar Bank") is a Bahrain-based Islamic retail bank that is licensed and regulated by the Central Bank of Bahrain and provides retail, commercial, treasury & financial institutions and other banking services. 

Ithmaar Bank is a wholly owned subsidiary of Ithmaar Holding B.S.C. which is listed on the Bahrain Bourse, and Dubai Financial Market.  

Ithmaar Bank provides a diverse range of Sharia-compliant products and services that cater to the financing and investment needs of individuals and institutions. Ithmaar also maintains a presence in overseas markets through its subsidiary, Faysal Bank Limited (Pakistan) and locally through Dilmunia Development Fund I L.P.

References
(2019). Ithmaarbank.com. Retrieved 14 April 2019, from https://www.ithmaarbank.com/sites/default/files/Ithmaar_Bank_AR2018_English2.pdf

Ithmaar Bank Annual Reports (2019):

English:
https://www.ithmaarbank.com/sites/default/files/pdf/ithmaar_bank-en2019_english.pdf

Arabic:
https://www.ithmaarbank.com/sites/default/files/pdf/ithmaar_bank-ar2019_Arabic.pdf

Ithmaar Bank Financial Statement (2019):

English:
https://www.ithmaarbank.com/sites/default/files/filemanager/02202020_Financials_Ithmaar_Bank_31_December_2019_full_set_signed_English.pdf

Arabic:
https://www.ithmaarbank.com/sites/default/files/filemanager/02202020_Financials_Ithmaar_Bank_31_December_2019_full_set_signed_Arabic.pdf

External links

Banks of Bahrain
Islamic banks
Banks established in 1982
1982 establishments in Bahrain
Companies based in Manama